Cardiff Bridge (also known locally as Canton Bridge) is the road bridge crossing the River Taff at the approximate site of the original river crossing, close to Cardiff Castle in the centre of Cardiff, Wales.

Early history

A bridge link crossing the Taff at Cardiff has existed since Roman times, though a safer river crossing beyond the tidal range was preferred at Llandaff, to the north. In 1582 the timber bridge was replaced by one built of stone, to the north of the current bridge and connecting to the town's Westgate. It was continually damaged by flooding and rebuilt in 1649, 1671 and 1720. When the Westgate was demolished in 1781 it was decided to relocate and rebuild the bridge. A narrow replacement was completed in 1796 (footpaths were later added supported by corbels). In 1827 another huge flood swept away the bridge and traffic reverted to using the crossing at Llandaff.

In 1859 a new stone bridge was built, incorporating parts of the earlier structure and with iron lattice railings. It was widened in 1877.

20th century
In 1930/1 the bridge was almost completed replaced with the currently existing bridge. This has broad arches made from reinforced concrete supported on stone pillars with a rusticated finish. Above each pier was a cenotaph-style obelisk holding a bronze torch.

The bridge was Grade II listed in 2002, being a good and original pre-World War II reinforced concrete bridge.

21st century
In 2014 segregated cycle paths in each direction were constructed, separating cyclists from pedestrians and motor vehicles.

See also
List of bridges in Wales

References

External links

Bridges completed in 1931
Bridges in Cardiff
Bridges over the River Taff
Concrete bridges in the United Kingdom
Grade II listed bridges in Wales
Rebuilt buildings and structures in Wales
Road bridges in Wales